NHS West Essex was a NHS primary care trust (PCT) in Essex, England. Formed in October 2006 following the merger of the three previous primary care trusts – Epping Forest, Harlow and Uttlesford, it has an annual budget of £370m. It is responsible for improving primary care and the health of the local population and with a statutory responsibility for providing health services.

Health Services 
NHS West Essex also plans and commissions (purchases) health services from hospitals for its local population from primarily four local hospital Trusts:
Princess Alexandra Hospital NHS Trust
 Cambridge University Hospitals NHS Foundation Trust (Addenbrookes Hospital)
Mid Essex Hospital Services NHS Trust (Broomfield Hospital)
Whipps Cross University Hospital NHS Trust.

Community Health 
NHS West Essex works closely with community health services, relying on the contribution that the network of community hospitals, health centres, GP practises, dentists, optometrists and pharmacists make to give the public access to a wide range of services without having to travel to hospital. Across West Essex there are: 198 GPs in 40 practices, 100 dentists in 32 practices, 87 opticians in 31 practices and 46 pharmacists (Source: NHS West Essex Annual Report 2008-2009)

Trust Headquarters and other sites 
The PCT headquarters was at St. Margaret's Community Hospital in Epping. Other sites include:
 Harlow Walk-in Centre 
 Ongar War Memorial Hospital 
 Saffron Walden Community Hospital 
 St. Margaret's Community Hospital

PCT board 
The NHS West Essex Board comprises a chairman, Alan Tobias, and five non-executive directors who are appointed by the Secretary of State, along with the chief executive, Catherine O’Connell, and directors and local GPs. The board is responsible for the PCT's strategic direction, its business plans and monitoring process, and also to ensure public accountability and involvement.

Board members include: Alan Tobias OBE, Chairman, Catherine O’Connell, Chief Executive, Stephen King, Non-Executive Director, Jackie Sully, Non-Executive Director, John Lappin, Non-Executive Director, Qadir Bakhsh, Non-Executive Director, Michael Smith, Non-Executive Director, Dean Westcott, Director of Finance, Jenny Minihane, Director of Nursing and Modernisation, Alison Cowie, Director of Public Health

References

 Health in West Essex - Annual Report of the Director of Public Health 2007 Health in West Essex
 NHS West Essex Annual Report 2008-2009 Annual Report 2008/2009
 NHS West Essex Annual Report 2007-2008 Annual Report 2007/2008
 Strategy for Healthcare - West Essex Primary Care Trust 2008-2012 Strategy for Healthcare 2008-2012
 The National Archives - West Essex Health Authority National Archives

External links 
NHS West Essex web site
Organisation structure

Health in Essex
Defunct NHS trusts